Deh Now-e Maragh (also Romanized as Deh Now-e Marāgh, Dehnow Maragh, Deh Now-ye Marāgh, and Deh-i-Nau Marāgh) is a village in Bandar Charak Rural District, Shibkaveh District, Bandar Lengeh County, Hormozgan Province, Iran. At the 2006 census, its population was 163, in 29 families.

References 

Populated places in Bandar Lengeh County